Gil Hae-yeon is a South Korean actress. She is best known to North American audiences for her performance in the film In Her Place, for which she garnered a Canadian Screen Award nomination for Best Supporting Actress at the 3rd Canadian Screen Awards in 2015 and won the Wildflower Film Award for Best Supporting Actress at the 3rd Wildflower Film Awards in 2016.

In South Korea, her roles have included the television series Goodbye Mr. Black, Working Mom Parenting Daddy, Possessed, Something in the Rain, One Spring Night and Woman of 9.9 Billion. She is most active as a supporting actress, playing role of main characters' mothers.

Filmography

Film

Television series

Web series

Theater

References

External links

South Korean film actresses
Living people
South Korean television actresses
1964 births